"No More 'I Love You's' is a song written by British musicians David Freeman and Joseph Hughes and originally recorded by them as the Lover Speaks. It was released in 1986 as the lead single from their self-titled debut album. The song was covered by the Scottish singer Annie Lennox and became a commercial success for her in 1995, reaching number two on the UK Singles Chart.

The Lover Speaks version
"No More 'I Love You's was the debut single for The Lover Speaks. After signing to A&M Records in early 1986, the band soon began recording their debut album with Jimmy Iovine as co-producer. In July, "No More 'I Love You's was released as the first single from the album and reached No. 58 in the UK Singles Chart. It was the duo's only UK chart entry because the album and successive singles failed to chart. On 21 March 1988, the song was re-released as a single in the UK, but again failed to chart.

Background
"No More 'I Love You's had been the first song written by Freeman and Hughes as The Lover Speaks. It was demoed on a portastudio during a rehearsal studio session, featuring Robert Farrell (guitar), Barry Gilbert (keyboards) and Pete King (drums). It was then demoed again with the same line-up at Pathway Studios. Hughes' ex-girlfriend and singer June Miles-Kingston provided backing vocals. This demo was used as a guide when recording the studio version for their debut album. The recording of the song with Iovine used backing vocals from Freeman (sped-up to increase the pitch), Miles-Kingston and Alex Brown.

As with each track on The Lover Speaks album, "No More 'I Love You's is based on a concept in Roland Barthes' book A Lover's Discourse: Fragments (Fragments d'un discours amoureux). In the liner notes of the 2015 re-issue of the album, Freeman revealed of the track's lyrics: "Lyrically, when you say to someone "I love you", it could be to your kids, your lover, your parents, usually, you hear, 'I love you, too'. And then one day you say, 'I love you', and there's silence because that person has reached the 'no more "I love you's" stage'. They cannot say 'I love you, too'. It's as simple as that. All I did lyrically, I think, was put it in Gothic terms."

Music video
A music video was filmed to promote the single. In America, it received active rotation on MTV.

Release
"No More 'I Love You's was released on 7-inch and 12-inch vinyl by A&M in the UK, Germany, France, Australia, America and Canada. The B-side, "This Can't Go On!", was taken from The Lover Speaks album. The 12-inch version of the single included the additional B-side, "Of Tears", also from the album.

In 1988, A&M re-issued the single in the UK on 7-inch, 12-inch and CD. On the 7-inch release, "Tremble Dancing" was the B-side. The 12-inch and CD formats included an extended version of "Tremble Dancing", along with "Every Lover's Sign" and "I Close My Eyes and Count to Ten".

Critical reception
Upon its release, Billboard described the song as "a dreamy, eerie, British beat ballad that carries rock overstatement to splendid heights and misses no Spectorian trick; towering walls of sound". Cash Box considered it a "captivating debut" with a "hooky female refrain and powerful lead vocal". In a review of the single's April 1988 re-issue, Smash Hits selected it as their "single of the fortnight", with reviewer Tom Doyle stating, "It originally flopped without dignity, but at least the Lover Speaks have the rather good sense to realise this record deserves to be top five and that nothing less will do. You're sure to recognise it, and whimper and blub at the tale of lurve gone mouldy which unfolds."

In a retrospective review of The Lover Speaks, Michael Sutton of AllMusic praised the song as "stylishly crafted, soulful pop elevated by Freeman's booming voice". He also noted the song's "soaring, heartbreaking chorus". Imran Khan of PopMatters noted the song's difference to Lennox's cover, with the original "opting for a far more baroque and windswept drama of romance and pop" which he considered to be "an apt description of exactly what the Lover Speaks was all about".

Track listings

1986 release
 7-inch single
 "No More 'I Love You's – 4:04
 "This Can't Go On!" – 3:49

 12-inch single
 "No More 'I Love You's – 4:04
 "Of Tears" – 3:37
 "This Can't Go On!" – 3:49

1988 release
 7-inch single
 "No More 'I Love You's – 4:04
 "Tremble Dancing" – 4:16

 12-inch single
 "No More 'I Love You's – 4:04
 "Tremble Dancing (Extended)" – 5:17
 "Every Lover's Sign" – 4:38
 "I Close My Eyes and Count to Ten" – 4:50

 CD single
 "No More 'I Love You's – 4:04
 "Tremble Dancing (Extended)" – 5:17
 "Every Lover's Sign" – 4:38
 "I Close My Eyes and Count to Ten" – 4:50

Charts

Annie Lennox version

Scottish singer and songwriter Annie Lennox covered "No More 'I Love You's"  and released as the lead single from her second studio album, Medusa (1995), in February 1995. The song features slightly altered lyrics from the original version and added background vocals that can be heard around the 2:50 mark of the song.

Lennox's version was a commercial success, topping the singles charts of Canada, Italy and Spain, reaching number two on the UK Singles Chart, and becoming a top-20 hit in at least 10 other countries. In the United States, the song reached number 23 on the Billboard Hot 100 and peaked atop the Dance Club Songs chart. In 1996, the song won Lennox the Grammy Award for Best Female Pop Vocal Performance at the 38th Annual Grammy Awards, the first to be awarded to a British artist. Her version was also featured in the very first episode of The Sopranos.

Background
In a 1995 article she wrote for The Independent, Lennox stated why she chose to record her own version of the song: 

David Freeman said in 2015: "When Annie Lennox covered 'No More "I Love You's"', she nailed it! She has the ability to be camp and soulful. We were very lucky that she recorded our song."

Music video
Lennox co-directed the accompanying music video for the song with Joe Dyer. The vaudeville styled video featured Lennox performing with travesti ballerinos (one of whom is played by actor Jake Canuso), in homage to Les Ballets Trockadero de Monte Carlo. It was nominated for an MTV award in the category for Best Female Video. Gavin Report praised it as a contender for "video of the year." Music Week viewed it as a "hugely effective if slightly unsettling costume video".

Critical reception
The song received positive reviews from most music critics. AllMusic editor Rick Anderson wrote in his review of Medusa, that Lennox's rendition of "No More I Love You's" is "ravishingly, heartbreakingly lovely". Larry Flick from Billboard found that "she picks up right where she left off floating fluttering phrases over a sea of atmospheric synths and strings that are propelled by a subtle, shuffling beat." He added that the track "builds to a dramatic musical climax that perfectly suits the declarative tone of the lyrics." Karen Allen from Cash Box noted its "orchestral plush". Dave Sholin from the Gavin Report remarked, "Whenever Annie Lennox steps in front of a microphone, something magnificent happens. The twists and turns of this haunting new release are a perfect match for her unique talent. And just when it seems all original video concepts have been exhausted, along comes this contender for video of the year." Another editors, Fell and Rufer, said, "Here's yet another way to say "It's over, baby." This new Lennox single is a richly-orchestrated breakup song with excellent adult appeal." Karen Leverich from The Heights described it as "a serene blend of voices". Irish Evening Herald felt it "successfully bridged the gap between Nineties pop sophistication and her ritzy hits with Dave Stewart", while Irish Independent praised it as a "gem". Chuck Campbell from Knoxville News Sentinel felt the song is using "a sweeping arrangement" a la "Why", remarking that the singer "draws on her gift of smirking melancholy."

In his weekly UK chart commentary, James Masterton stated, that it's "her own beautifully-rendered and faithful version of one of the great long-lost classics of British pop. Right down from the purity of her voice, the cuteness of the backing vocals and the impeccable Valentine's day timing, the song could hardly fail to be a hit." Pan-European magazine Music & Media concluded with that "it's that contrast between the superbly sophisticated cover of the Lover Speaks' 1986 soul hit and the weird intermezzo of talking and hysterical laughing that makes it so irresistible." Head of music Liz Elliott at Metro Radio Group/Newcastle said, "Because she mostly only cuts original material, at first nobody realised it was a cover. Then we all admitted how cleverly she has adjusted the song to her own style." A reviewer from Music Week gave it five out of five, adding that "this unusual song sounds stunning given the Lennox treatment. Radio will gobble it up and, given that it is accompanied by another hugely effective if slightly unsettling costume video, TV will, too." John Kilgo from The Network Forty felt that "it shouldn't take more than one listen to know this mass-appeal song is a total smash." He added that Lennox' "displays incredibly polished vocals". In an retrospective review, Pop Rescue declared the song as "a fantastic showcase for her vocals". Elizabeth Morse from The Stanford Daily called it "bittersweet" and "a cheerful melody intertwined with devastatingly disconsolate lyrics".

Commercial performance
The song became the highest-charting solo single for Lennox in the United Kingdom, entering and peaking at number two on the UK Singles Chart for two weeks. It spent a total of 12 weeks on the UK chart. The track also became a top-25 hit in the United States, peaking at number 23 on the Billboard Hot 100. With it, Lennox won the 1995 Grammy Award for Best Female Pop Vocal Performance. The song topped Canada's RPM 100 Hit Tracks chart, Italy's Musica e dischi chart, and Spain's AFYVE chart; on the Canadian chart, the song was Lennox's second number-one hit, following "Walking on Broken Glass" in 1992.

Samples

Lennox's version of "No More 'I Love You's has been sampled multiple times. It was first sampled for the Nicki Minaj song "Your Love" on her 2010 single. The song was originally recorded two years before but never intended to be put out for release until it was leaked in January 2010. After becoming a hit, it was slightly rewritten and re-recorded and this revised version was released in June 2010. Prior to the official release of Minaj's song, the cover was sampled in 2009 by Jason Derulo and Auburn in their song "How Did We". It was then sampled by J.R. Rotem for singer Razah's 2010 single called "I Remember", using the same instrumental beat used for "How Did We". Singer Hailee Steinfeld included the sample as well in her 2020 single "I Love You's".

Legacy
In 2015, Idolator ranked Lennox' version of "No More 'I Love You's'" one of "The 50 Best Pop SIngles Of 1995". An editor, Stephen Sears, wrote that the song "is a linguist's delight — "changes are shifting outside the words" — with a lyric about the verbal clues of a fading love affair." He added, "Lennox's theatrical vocal is on a high wire throughout the song, climbing up and down the scales. She made subtle tweaks to the original lyrics and added a bizarre, spoken middle eight in which she assumes a child's voice, gushing, "There are monsters outside!" The lush moment at 3:08, when a multi-tracked Lennox cascades back in, is flat-out beautiful. "No More 'I Love You's lives as a testament to the power of the vocalist as an actor."

Track listings
7-inch single

CD 1

CD 2

 Tracks 2, 3, and 4 are taken from a live acoustic session for MTV Unplugged in July 1992

"Whiter Shade of Pale"/"No More 'I Love You's

 Medley of "No More 'I Love You's, "Take Me to the River", and "Downtown Lights"
+ Junior's Radio Edit

Charts and sales

Weekly charts

Year-end charts

Certifications and sales

Other versions

David Freeman released a version of the song on his fifth solo studio album Apart & Together (1996). It was recorded in 1985 at Pathway Studios, with additional recording in August 1992 and the summer of 1996. It features Freeman on vocals, guitar, synth and piano, Joseph Hughes on bass, June Miles-Kingston on vocals, Ian Thomas on drums and tambourine, and Robert Farrell on electric guitar. The recording was produced by Freeman, Hughes and Michael Finesilver.
Maria Pia De Vito covered the song for her 2009 album, Mind the Gap.
Mexican experimental rock musician Juan Son covered the song in 2009 for the mariachi-covers compilation Mariachi Rock-O.
The song was covered by Welsh singer Rhydian for the album Waves (2011).
A substantially rewritten version titled "I Love You's" was released by singer and actress Hailee Steinfeld on 26 March 2020. Except for the "doo bee doo bee" background vocals and the "no more I love yous" refrain, the lyrics and melody are completely different. This version lists Sarah Griffiths, Jessica Agombar and David Stewart as co-writers along with Hughes and Freeman. Steinfeld said her version is intended to be a homage to Lennox.

References

1986 songs
1986 debut singles
1995 singles
The Lover Speaks songs
Annie Lennox songs
Number-one singles in Italy
RPM Top Singles number-one singles
Song recordings produced by Jimmy Iovine
Song recordings produced by Stephen Lipson
Grammy Award for Best Female Pop Vocal Performance
Number-one singles in Spain
A&M Records singles
Arista Records singles